Birchwood is a town and civil parish in the Borough of Warrington, Cheshire, England. It had a population of 11,395 at the 2001 census. Historically part of Lancashire, it was built during the time of much expansion in Warrington as it became a "new town". Birchwood is separated into three residential estates: Gorse Covert (grid ref SJ665925, population 2,790), Oakwood (grid ref SJ656914, population 4,381) and Locking Stumps (grid ref SJ645918, population 2,759), with all the main facilities grouped around the centre.

Geography 
The area east of Birchwood is mainly birch forests and Risley Moss, part of the Mersey Forest. Risley Moss is a Site of Special Scientific Interest. The bulk of Birchwood is built on the site of the former ROF Risley Royal Ordnance Factory, with Birchwood Forest Park lying in the centre, in which the old bunkers from the factory form part of the landscape.

History 
"The surface, at a distance, looks black and dirty, and will bear neither horse nor man….. What nature meant by such a useless production 'tis hard to imagine, but the land is entirely to waste" are the words of Daniel Defoe as he rode through Risley in 1724. (Later part of the Risley area was renamed Birchwood as the Warrington 'New town' development).

In the past travellers avoided the Risley (Birchwood) area because it of its dangerous mossland, however gradually over time much of the fertile mossland was reclaimed and turned into farm land. With the advent of the Second World War, 927 acres (3.8 km²) of agricultural land was changed into a massive Royal Ordnance Factory, ROF Risley. The location was chosen because the low lying mist and cloud helped camouflage the factory from the air; according to a local builder: "It was very lonely and misty at night, and that's why the factory was constructed there ... it was usually covered with a mist or cloud. It was hard to see it in the day time, you know". Although the location of the factory was known by the German Luftwaffe, the factory was bombed only once during the war.

A number of bunkers were also built (some can still be seen today) to house the munitions, to protect them from potential bombing, and also to segregate the site and reduce the consequences of any accidental explosions during manufacture or storage. Although these bunkers are on the surface, they are covered with soil and turf and so give the impression of being underground.

However, after the war the factory no longer had a purpose other than as a storage depot and so in 1956 the north west of the factory was sold to UKAEA with the entire disused area being put on the market in 1963. No buyer was found for it until 1968, when the Warrington and Runcorn Development Corporation bought the site and turned it into the new town of Birchwood.

Shopping 
The area's principal shopping needs are serviced by Birchwood Shopping Centre, with many shops such as a large Asda store, two cafes and a Greggs. There are also a number of smaller shops in each village of the town. Each one has a local convenience store that sell needs such as bread and milk. Local milk and vegetable delivery services supply houses in the area, as well as the delivery services from the large supermarkets. There are a few farms in the area that sell small quantities of eggs and other local produce directly to local shoppers.

Transport 

Birchwood is located close to the intersections between the M6 and M62 and the M6 and M56 and the railway station on the Liverpool--Manchester train line. There are frequent bus services (routes 17 and 25) to Warrington town centre, and to Culcheth and Leigh (routes 28 and 28A). Details of all these services can be found on the Warrington's Own Buses website.

Rail 
Birchwood railway station is operated by Northern with trains stopping bound for Manchester, Liverpool and Warrington Central as well as long distance services to Norwich which are operated by East Midlands Railway during the peak hours only. Trains pass through three times an hour per direction:

 Two suburban trains per hour to Manchester Oxford Road via Irlam
 Two suburban trains per hour to Liverpool Lime Street via Warrington Central
 One fast train per hour to Liverpool Lime Street stopping only at Warrington Central and Liverpool South Parkway en route
 One fast train per hour to Manchester Airport via Manchester Piccadilly

Road 
Birchwood is very close to Junction 11 of the M62, providing access to Liverpool (22 miles/35 km) and Manchester (15 miles/24 km). Junction 11 is notable for the Encounter statue (also known as the Angel of Birchwood). Birchwood is close to Junction 21 of the M6, giving access to Birmingham (80 miles/128 km).

Buses 

There are six bus routes operating through the Birchwood area, all of which are operated by Warrington's Own Buses.

The 17 and 25 operate through all parts of Birchwood to Warrington, with the Gorse Covert SPAR shop (25) or Oakwood Keyes Close (17) acting as termini. The routes differ in the precise routes they take to Warrington bus station, and in their regularity. Service 25 is the main service, The 28E operates the evening services Monday to Saturday going from Warrington bus station to Leigh bus station. The first service starts at 19:00 and the last service is at 23:00 departing at each ends of the line

The 28 also starts at Warrington bus station, then through Birchwood and on to Leigh via Culcheth. The 28A operates the same route but does not go through Birchwood or Oakwood.

A shuttle bus service for workers runs between the railway station and Birchwood Park business park.

Education 
Birchwood is served by three primary schools, one per area, and Birchwood Community High School. Birchwood College is next to the high school.

Industry 
To the north of the Royal Ordnance Factory (ROF), Risley, was the site chosen for the design offices and headquarters of the Department of ATomic ENergy (DATEN) after the Second World War. Later to become the United Kingdom Atomic Energy Authority (UKAEA), the offices were charged with the manufacture of the nuclear reactors and process plants at Windscale to help build the UK's atomic defence. Following on from the weapons program, the Risley offices were responsible for the building of the Magnox and AGR designs of reactor in the UK. In 1971 BNFL was set up from the production division of the (UKAEA), and until 2003 its headquarters were at Risley, near Warrington. BNFLs headquarters are now at Daresbury Park industrial estate, also near to Warrington.

BNFL (now represented by Sellafield Ltd and Nexia Solutions) maintains a large office of the site, which is something of a nuclear nexus, with AMEC (Formerly NNC), Nuvia (formerly NUKEM Engineering Limited), WS Atkins Design, Environment & Engineering, Nuclear Technologies plc, Serco and Assurance Quintessa (among others) based on Birchwood Park.

WS Atkins has one office in Birchwood, Warrington – Chadwick House (containing various business units including Water, Highways and Transportation, Design Solutions, Rail, Nuclear and Faithful+Gould).

Politics
It is in the Birchwood ward of Warrington borough. There are three councillors, two are Labour councillors (Russ Bowden and David Ellis) and one is Conservative (Nigel Balding).

The Labour councillor and council leader, Russ Bowden, was accused of electoral fraud by providing a false address to a returning officer whilst standing in the May 2021 elections. Russ Bowden denied the allegation and is due to stand trial in January 2023

Demography
Data is based on that of Birchwood Ward.

Population and ethnicity
Birchwood has a total population of 11,220 residents, of which 50.3% are male and 49.7% are female. The average age of the population at the census was 37.2 years. The majority of the population describe their race as White (97.05%), while minorities are mixed (0.9%), Black (0.4%) and Asian (0.9%). Other racial origins account for 0.8% of the population.

Housing and social situation
At the census, the Birchwood ward of Warrington had 4,919 houses. 65.6% are classed as owner occupied, 28.3% are council accommodation, 4.8% are rented from other sources and 1.3% of houses have residents living rent free. The average house price for all houses in Birchwood was £118,635. 7% of all households in the ward are overcrowded. The population density in the ward is 13.9 residents per hectare. In terms of the ACORN index, 35.7% (the majority) describe Warrington as a comfortably well-off area, on the other hand in terms of economic indices, Birchwood is a slightly below-average area. 5.4% of residents at the last survey were on some form of benefits.

Employment and education
At 2005, Birchwood had 65.6% employment, with only 3.4% of all economically active people unemployed. 2.8% of the population are students in full-time higher education. 28.2% of the total population are economically inactive (due to retirement, ill health, or full-time carer status). According to ward statistics, of the population (in Birchwood ward). 24.2% are unqualified (either due to leaving school early or failing the end of school examinations). 48.4% have level 1 or 2 qualifications (level 1 being 1+ GCSE (A*-G) or "O" Level or equivalent, level 2 being 5+ GCSEs (grades A*-C), 1+'A' levels/ AS levels (A-E) or equivalent). 20.8% have received level 3+ qualifications (meaning 2+ A-levels (A-E), 4+ AS-levels (A-E) or equivalent minimum).

Districts

Gorse Covert
Gorse Covert is the easternmost of the districts which form the town of Birchwood in Warrington. It is also the most easterly part of the Warrington urban area (though not of Warrington borough). It was formerly site 6 of the Royal Ordnance Factory at Risley. It is now a large, lively, suburban residential area with a mixture of good quality housing. It has a pub (The Poacher), and Indian Restaurant/Take Away (Birchwood Spice), a primary school (Gorse Covert Primary School), a pre-school (Village Pre-School) and a local shop (One Stop). Gorse Covert also has woodland areas and walks with views from Pestfurlong Hill.

At the 2001 census (the next one scheduled for 2011), there were 2791 residents living in 1191 properties (statistic areas 005B and 004B – Gorse Covert, Risley South and Locking Stumps East). Of these properties 81% are owner occupied, with the remainder being rented, either from the council, local housing authority or private landlords. Gorse Covert residents are approximately 23% more likely to be in paid employment than the average for England and Wales, with an unemployment rate of around 1.9% (around 53 residents) of all economically active people aged 16–74. 16% of economically active residents (i.e. 16- to 74-year-olds) don't have any form of qualification (around 446 residents).

Locking Stumps
Locking Stumps is the furthest west of the three districts in Birchwood. It has a population of  residents in  households. It is a relatively large district with a shop, public house (The Turf and Feather), takeaway shop, primary school (Locking Stumps Community Primary School), and a modern church (Thomas Risley United Reformed Church). This was enlarged in 2001 due to the growth of its congregation.

At the 2001 census, Office for National Statistics areas 004C and 004D the housing breaks down into:
873 owner occupied houses; 35 council owned houses; 189 rented (non-council) houses; and 5 which have undisclosed status.

Oakwood
Oakwood is a district of Birchwood, which is very close to the Birchwood centre. According to the 2001 census, there are 2003 properties, with a total of 4381 residents (this covers the ONS areas of 005A (Oakwood West, near Birchwood), 005C (Oakwood East, near Risely Moss) and 005D (Oakwood Central)).
Oakwood has various basic amenities including a convenience store complete with post office, a pub (Nelsons Quarterdeck), a takeaway shop, the Church of Transfiguration, a primary school (Birchwood CofE Primary and Nursery School) and a high school (Birchwood Community High School) which is now a Business and Enterprise College, and is a beacon high school.

At the 2001 census, of 2003 possible houses in Oakwood: 46% are owner occupied; 8% are council owned;
43% are rented (non council) properties; and 3% did not disclose their status.

Birchwood Park (Business Park)
Birchwood Park is a  mixed use business park and is located in the North West of England close to Warrington between Manchester and Liverpool. The M6 and M62 interchange is only minutes away and provides links to the surrounding region and beyond.

The site is owned by MEPC. 4,200 people are employed on the park, and a free bus service runs twice each morning from Warrington Bank Quay Station.

Notable residents
George Sampson, dancer and winner of Britain's Got Talent in 2008

See also

 Listed buildings in Birchwood
 Birchwood Forest Park
 Risley, Warrington
 Royal Ordnance Factory
 Birchwood railway station

References

External links

 Map of Zones
 Royal Ordnance Factory, Risley Note: As of 23 November 2008 this site appears to be non-functional. However, the Internet Archive has several cached snapshots over its period of operation 2001–2007
 Birchwood Evangelical Church
 Birchwood Park business park
 Birchwood Neighbourhoods Association

Gorse Covert
Map of Statistic Zones
 Gorse Covert Community Church
 Gallery of images of Gorse Covert

Oakwood
St Oliver Plunkett Catholic Church

Locking Stumps
Thomas Risley Church

Warrington
Civil parishes in Warrington
Towns in Cheshire